Congaree may refer to:
Congaree people, a tribe of Native Americans who lived in South Carolina
Congaree River, South Carolina, United States
Congaree National Park, South Carolina
Congaree (horse), American thoroughbred racehorse
Congaree Golf Club, a private golf club in Ridgeland, SC

See also
South Congaree, South Carolina, a town